Hoyle Casino is a virtual casino video game series, developed and published originally by Sierra Entertainment and since 2005 by Encore, Inc. It is a spin-off of Sierra's Hoyle's Official Book of Games series. Set in a virtual Las Vegas casino, players create profiles and are given a set amount of virtual money.  A player can then visit any part of the virtual casino and wager their virtual money as they could in a real casino. Hoyle Casino Empire is different from other games in the series as it is a business simulation game.

Editions
Hoyle Casino (1996)
Hoyle Casino [1998] (1997)
Hoyle Casino [1999] (1998)
Hoyle Casino [2000] (1999)
Hoyle Casino [2001] (2000)
Hoyle Casino [2002] (2001)
Hoyle Casino [2003] (2002)
Hoyle Casino [2004] (2003)
Hoyle Casino 3D (2005)
Hoyle Casino Games [2008] (2007)
Hoyle Casino Games [2012] (2011)
Hoyle Casino Games [2013] (2012) packaged with Hoyle Slots (2009) and Hoyle Swashbucklin' Slots (2010)
Hoyle Official Casino Games Collection (2016)

Spin-off editions:
Hoyle Casino Empire (2002)

Gameplay

2000 edition
The game offers instant access to the rules for each game, as well as real time tips and strategies as the player plays a game. Hoyle Casino features 25 default characters to choose from, or players can simply create their own unique custom character.

The 2000 edition was released for the Windows, Mac OS X, Dreamcast and Game Boy Color.

Games included

The 2016 edition of Hoyle Casino includes the following games:

3 Card Poker
5 Card Draw
5 Card Lowball
7 Card Stud
7 Card Stud Hi-Lo
Baccarat
Baseball Poker
Big Six Wheel
Bingo
Blackjack
Craps
Midnight Baseball Poker
Omaha Hold 'Em
Omaha Hold 'Em Hi-Lo
Pai Gow Poker
Roulette
Texas Hold 'Em
Video Blackjack
Video Keno
Video Poker (Single-Hand)
Video Poker (Multi-Hand)
Video Texas Hold 'Em

Controversy and bugs
The 2007 version of Hoyle Casino was plagued by a bug in the cards game. A player would place a bet, and then the game would freeze for 30 seconds before continuing. Encore was not able to fix this bug. Customers' only recourse was to visit the Encore USA website and submit a refund request for the software. This bug was fixed in Hoyle Casino 2008.

Reception
In North America, Hoyle Casino 2000 sold 230,365 units and earned $6.15 million from January through October 2000, according to PC Data.

References

External links

Casino video games
Dreamcast games
Game Boy Color games
MacOS games
Windows games
Digital card games
Sierra Entertainment games
Video game franchises introduced in 1996
Video games set in the Las Vegas Valley
Video games set in Nevada
Video games developed in the United States